Spilotabanus is a genus of horse flies in the family Tabanidae.

Species
Spilotabanus multiguttatus (Kröber, 1930)
Spilotabanus triaurius Wilkerson, 1979

References

Tabanidae
Diptera of South America
Taxa named by Graham Fairchild
Brachycera genera